Western goldenrod is a common name for several plants and may refer to:

Euthamia occidentalis
Solidago lepida, native to North America